Kyle Ferguson (born 24 September 1999) is a Scottish professional footballer who plays for Harrogate Town as a central defender.

Career
Born in Glasgow, Ferguson played youth football for Rangers, Kilmarnock, and Airdrieonians, before playing senior football with Clyde. He then played college soccer for Medaille College and in Sweden for Ytterhogdal, before signing for Irish club Waterford. After playing with English club Altrincham, he signed for Harrogate Town in June 2022. In February 2023, Ferguson returned to Altrincham on a one month loan.

Personal life
He is a member of a footballing family which includes his father Barry Ferguson, uncle Derek Ferguson and cousin Lewis Ferguson (who was once a teammate in the Rangers academy). He has also done some modelling work.

References

1999 births
Living people
Scottish footballers
Rangers F.C. players
Kilmarnock F.C. players
Airdrieonians F.C. players
Clyde F.C. players
Ytterhogdals IK players
Waterford F.C. players
Altrincham F.C. players
Harrogate Town A.F.C. players
Scottish Professional Football League players
Association football defenders
English Football League players
League of Ireland players
Expatriate association footballers in the Republic of Ireland
Scottish expatriate footballers
Scottish expatriate sportspeople in the United States
Scottish expatriate sportspeople in Ireland
Scottish expatriate sportspeople in Sweden
Expatriate footballers in Sweden
Expatriate soccer players in the United States
Footballers from Glasgow
National League (English football) players